Disorder in the Court is a 1936 short subject directed by Preston Black starring American slapstick comedy team The Three Stooges (Moe Howard, Larry Fine and Curly Howard). It is the 15th entry in the series released by Columbia Pictures starring the comedians, who released 190 shorts for the studio between 1934 and 1959.

Plot
The Stooges are key witnesses at a murder trial. Their friend and colleague, Gail Tempest, is a dancer at the Black Bottom cafe where the Stooges are musicians. She is accused of killing Kirk Robin (a play on "Who Killed Cock Robin?").

When the Stooges are called to the witness stand, they are nowhere to be found. The defense attorney goes out into the hall only to find the Stooges playing jacks and tic-tac-toe simultaneously on the floor. After considerable mutual frustration, the court finally swears in Curly, who begins to describe the events that took place on the night of the murder. He offers to show the court exactly what happened. The Stooges and Tempest are part of a musical act; Tempest and the Stooges break into their musical routine to prove this, with Larry on violin, Moe on harmonica, and Curly on both spoons and upright bass while Tempest dances.

The act is interrupted when Larry unknowingly mistakes a man's toupée for a tarantula and Moe subsequently takes the guard's gun and starts shooting the toupée, causing pandemonium in the court. Then, Moe and Curly re-enact the actual murder (with Curly on the receiving end). Moe looks at a parrot, who was at the murder scene, and sees a note tied to its foot. He opens the parrot cage, unintentionally releasing it. The Stooges eventually capture the bird by shooting water at it through a fire hose. Moe reads the letter out loud and reveals that it is a confession from the real murderer, Buck Wing, which finally proves Tempest's innocence. The note also says that Buck Wing will disappear.

The Stooges and Tempest were going to get their picture taken; however, the fire hose, which Curly tied up earlier, explodes and sprays water everywhere.

Cast

Credited
 Moe Howard as Moe
 Larry Fine as Larry
 Curly Howard as Curly

Uncredited
 Bud Jamison as Defense Attorney
 Harry Semels as District Attorney
 Suzanne Kaaren as Gail Tempest
 James C. Morton as Court clerk
 Edward LeSaint as Judge
 Al Thompson as Bailiff
 Eddie Laughton as Co-Counsel
 Johnny Kascier as Court recorder
 Alice Belcher as Flirting juror
 Solomon Horwitz as Gallery spectator
 Harold Kening as Gallery spectator
 Bobby Barber as Gallery spectator
 Bobby Burns as Gallery spectator
 Sam Lufkin as Gallery spectator
 Arthur Thalasso as Tall man in Hallway

Production notes
Disorder in the Court was filmed over six days on April 1–6, 1936. The film title is a play on the stereotypical judge's cry, "Order in the court!"

A colorized version of this film was released in 2006 as part of the DVD collection "Stooges on the Run."

The two Howard brothers' real life father Sol Horwitz, (the father of Moe, Curly, and Shemp Howard), makes an uncredited appearance as a member of the public audience.

This is the first Stooges short in which Curly is spelled "C-U-R-L-Y" in the opening titles instead of the previous "C-U-R-L-E-Y." The title card also has the Stooges inverted reading from left to right, Curly-Larry-Moe, as opposed to Moe-Larry-Curly in previous shorts, effectively giving Curly "top billing." This change in the title card coincides with the refined and more familiar Columbia Pictures image of a torch-bearing woman, with a shimmering light instead of the primitive animation of light rays in the previous version. In addition, the "Columbia" theme now uses a more upbeat theme, featuring a brass introduction.

Copyright status
Disorder in the Court  is one of four Columbia Stooges shorts that fell into the public domain after the copyright lapsed in the 1960s, the other three being Malice in the Palace (1949), Sing a Song of Six Pants and Brideless Groom (both 1947). Consequently, these four shorts frequently appear on budget video compilations and streaming services.

In popular culture

The presumed perpetrator is a dancer named Buck Wing, a reference to the buck-and-wing dance common in vaudeville and minstrel shows.

The classic "swearing in" routine ("Take off your hat!"; "Raise your right hand"; "Judgy Wudgy") was borrowed nearly verbatim from Buster Keaton's 1931 film Sidewalks of New York, directed by Stooges producer Jules White.

A shot of the trio performing in court was used by Hershey's in a 1980s advertising campaign.

The short appears in the 2019 horror film 3 from Hell.

See also
 Public domain film
 List of American films of 1936
 List of films in the public domain in the United States

References

External links

 
 
Disorder in the Court at threestooges.net 
 

The Three Stooges films
1936 films
1936 comedy films
American slapstick comedy films
American black-and-white films
1930s English-language films
American courtroom films
Columbia Pictures short films
Articles containing video clips
American crime comedy films
1930s American films
English-language crime comedy films